Fox Chapel Area High School (Established in 1961) is a public school located in the Pittsburgh suburb of O'Hara Township, Allegheny County, Pennsylvania, United States. It was recognized and honored as a National Blue Ribbon School twice.

The Fox Chapel Area High School serves the municipalities of Fox Chapel, Aspinwall, Blawnox, Indiana, O'Hara and Sharpsburg.

Test scores and other notable achievements
•The Fox Chapel Area Keystone Exam pass rates for 11th graders have also all increased, and more than 90 percent of students are passing the Algebra I, literature, and biology exams.

•In 2013–2014, Fox Chapel Area exceeded the standards for student academic growth in 26 percent of the categories. In 2015–2016, Fox Chapel Area exceeded the standards for student academic growth in 80 percent of the categories.

•A total of 420 students graduated in the class of 2017, and 89.5 percent of the class is enrolled in some form of continuing education.

•The high school was recognized for Programs of Distinction in Visual Arts in 2015 and received Exemplary Educational Program Credentials in music and school counseling in 2012 from the Middle States Association Commissions on Elementary and Secondary Schools.

•Fox Chapel Area High School has been awarded Silver Medal rankings by U.S. News & World Report over the past decade and is consistently ranked among the nation's top high schools by Newsweek.

•The high school is also ranked among the top 200 high schools in the nation and received an “A+ Overall Niche Grade” on niche.com.

•The school was also named among the 2017 Washington Post's America's Most Challenging High Schools.

•Fox Chapel Area High School's Orchestra Director, Mrs. Mairi Cooper was named Pennsylvania's 2015 teacher of the year.

Recent high school renovations 
High school renovations were completed in 2016 and the building has a new swimming pool/natatorium and an upgraded library/media center, auditorium, cafeteria, and commons area. The high school includes state-of-the-art computer, science, digital art, technology, and music labs.

Current student demographics 
As of October 2017.

Athletic interscholastic sports teams 
Baseball (Boys’ – Spring)

Basketball (Boys’, Girls’ – Winter)

Cheerleading (Girls’ – Fall, Winter)

Cross Country (Boys’, Girls’ – Fall)

Field Hockey (Girls’ – Fall)

Football (Boys’ – Fall)

Golf (Boys’, Girls’ – Fall)

Gymnastics (Girls’ – Winter)

Indoor Track (Boys’, Girls’ – Winter)

Lacrosse (Boys’, Girls’ – Spring)

Soccer (Boys’, Girls’ – Fall)

Softball (Girls’ – Spring)

Swimming/Diving (Boys’, Girls’ – Winter)

Tennis (Girls’ – Fall, Boys’ – Spring)

Track & Field (Boys’, Girls’ – Spring)

Volleyball (Girls’ – Fall, Boys’ – Winter)

Wrestling (Boys’ – Winter)

Notable alumni 
 Reb Beach - guitarist
 Adam Bisnowaty - NFL football player
 Chip Ganassi - racing driver and team owner
 Gaelen Gilliland - musical theater actress
 Jeff Habay - Pennsylvania State Representative
 Eddie Ifft - stand-up comedian
 Michael Mitnick - screenplay writer for The Giver
 Anisha Nagarajan (2002) - actress and singer
 Beth Stern - television personality and actress
 Rick Strom - professional football player and football commentator
 William Thomas - professional ice hockey player
 Leo Wisniewski - professional football player

References

External links
Fox Chapel Area High School 
Fox Chapel Area Adult Education

Educational institutions established in 1961
Public high schools in Pennsylvania
Schools in Allegheny County, Pennsylvania
1961 establishments in Pennsylvania